The 2010 Sydney to Hobart Yacht Race, sponsored by Rolex and hosted by Cruising Yacht Club of Australia in Sydney, New South Wales, was the 66th annual running of the "blue water classic" Sydney to Hobart Yacht Race. The 2010 race began on Sydney Harbour, at 1pm on Boxing Day (26 December 2010), before heading south for  through the Tasman Sea, past Bass Strait, into Storm Bay and up the River Derwent, to cross the finish line in Hobart, Tasmania.

The race saw 87 starters but several were forced to retire due to the severe weather. In the end, 69 finished.

Results

Line Honours results (Top 10)

Handicap results (Top 10)

References

Sydney to Hobart Yacht Race
S
2010 in Australian sport
December 2010 sports events in Australia